Musidisc is a French record label that provides music and home video distribution. It was founded in 1927, and purchased by Universal Music Group in 1999.

History
Musidisc is known for having produced a rare recording of Jeanne Calment, who has had the longest confirmed human life span in history. On February 19, 1996, just two days before her 121st birthday, Time's Mistress, a four-track CD of Calment speaking over a background of rap and hip hop, was released.

Sublabels
Accord
Adda
Ades

References

External links
 Discography

Record labels established in 1927
French record labels
Jazz record labels